Formula-G or Turkish Solar Car Grand Prix is a solar car championship. The last race was done in Ankara, Turkey in 2007. The first and second positions in this year was held by the teams of Istanbul Technical University. The third place was held by Sakarya University. The 2005 and 2006 races were both held in Istanbul Park, Turkey, the former being held on 30 August.

Results 
SOCRATR from Istanbul University have won the race in 2009.

Competing teams 
 Istanbul Technical University
 İYTE Formula
 Middle East Technical University Robot Society Formula
 Sakarya University
 Kocaeli University Mechatronics Engineering
 Yildiz Technical University
 Ankara University
 Middle East Technical University Robot Society
 Atılım University Solar Car Team

References

External links
 TUBITAK BILTEK - The Organizer Institute (In Turkish)

Green racing
G